The Women's Team Pursuit was one of the 8 women's events at the 2008 UCI Track Cycling World Championships, held in Manchester, United Kingdom.
42 cyclists from 14 countries participated in the contest. After the qualification, the fastest two teams advanced to the final and the 3rd and 4th fastest raced for the bronze medal.

The qualification took place on 28 March and the finals were held later the same day.

World record

Qualifying

Finals

References

Women's team pursuit
UCI Track Cycling World Championships – Women's team pursuit